When Andrew Came Home, released in the UK as Taming Andrew, is a 2000 American drama television film directed by Artie Mandelberg and starring Park Overall, Seth Adkins, Jason Beghe, and Evan Laszlo. It is based on a true story.

Plot 
Ted and his girlfriend Patty kidnap Andrew, Ted's son by his ex-wife Gail. Gail informs the police, but no report is filed. Five years later, Ted returns Andrew to Gail, who has since remarried and has a new son.

When Andrew shows signs of arrested development, Gail takes him to both a doctor and a psychiatrist. They want to send Andrew to a special residential school to help him catch up in his academics. Gail refuses to part with her son once again, so Andrew goes to state-run school instead.

At school, a student named Carl Rudnick bullies Andrew, who responds by urinating on Carl. The principal calls both Gail and Carl's mother. Mrs. Rudnick calls Andrew a freak and says that he should not be in public school, even yelling at Andrew after he apologizes. After Carl and his mother leave, Gail has a discussion with the principal. He wants to hold Andrew back, but she refuses and takes him out of the school. At home, Andrew is nonverbal and incapable of trust. His bizarre behavior drives away Eddie, who moves in with his mother, taking the baby.

Gail begins to teach Andrew at home. Slowly but surely, Andrew makes progress, and things get better for the family. Eddie and baby EJ move back into the house. Social Services tells Gail that if Andrew isn't on grade level by the time the summer ends, she will be forced to send him to the special school. Gail takes Andrew to her brother's farm so he can learn in a new atmosphere where he has no history. Andrew learns how to milk a cow and how to care for the animals very quickly, but still fails academically.

Andrew overhears Gail tell her brother that if she had a choice to pick her son, it wouldn't have been Andrew. He runs out to the stables with Gail close behind. Gail apologizes and Andrew falls asleep in the stables. When he wakes up, Andrew tells his mother about the abuse he suffered at the hands of his father and Patty. He tells his mother that he is home and the two cry in each other's arms and sing their bedtime song together.

Gail and Andrew return home to Eddie and EJ to build a healthier life together. Ted goes to prison for kidnapping and child abuse.

Cast and crew

Cast 
 Park Overall – Gail
 Jason Beghe – Eddie
 Seth Adkins – Andrew
 Lynne Deragon – Joanne
 Craig Eldridge – Jack
 Shannon Lawson – Deena Drake
 Carl Marotte – Ted
 Patrick Chilvers – Officer Reston
 Jeff Clarke – Mr. Kemper
 Stan Coles – Dr. Burton
 Eve Crawford – Janet Hilgarde
 Jean Daigle – Officer Pearl
 Shane Daly – Highway Cop
 Jake Goldsbie – Carl Rudnick
 Bruce Gray – Dr. Matthews
 Katie Lai – Little Girl
 Bill Lake – Desk Sergeant
 Evan Laszlo – Young Andrew
 Joanne Reece – Officer Warner
 K Roberts – Margaret Granger
 Rhona Shekter – Mrs. Rudnick
 Jared Wall – Kid in Playground
 Patricia Zentilli – Pattie
 Hugo Hardinge – EJ
 Oliver Hardinge – EJ

Awards 
 Seth Adkins was nominated for a Young Artist Award (2001) 'Best Performance in a TV Movie (Drama) – Leading Young Actor'

References

External links 

2000 crime drama films
2000 drama films
2000 films
American crime drama films
2000s English-language films
Films about child abduction in the United States
Lifetime (TV network) films
Crime films based on actual events
2000s American films